2022 NATO summit may refer to:
 2022 NATO virtual summit (25 February)
 2022 Brussels extraordinary summit (24 March)
 2022 Madrid summit (28–30 June)